Havenaar is a surname. Notable people with the surname include:

Dido Havenaar (born 1957), Dutch-Japanese footballer
Mike Havenaar (born 1987), Japanese footballer
Nikki Havenaar (born 1995), Japanese footballer, son of Dido and brother of Mike